A bicycle cooperative ("bike co-op") can take the many forms of the cooperative model. These often include co-ops composed of businesses to achieve economies of scale (retail cooperative), co-ops managed by those who work at the business (worker cooperative), and bicycle co-ops owned and managed by the cyclists that use their services (consumers' co-operative). To date, many bicycle co-ops have taken the form of community bike shops and cooperatives organized to give the local bike shop national scale and buying power.

Bike cooperatives: community and consumer 
As a consumers' co-operative, community bike cooperatives are organized and owned by the cyclists who use them. Members often receive exclusive access and benefits to service and sales.

Shop time 
Shop time is considered to be the use of the bike co-op's space and tools. Some bike co-ops charge users a set fee of between US$5 and US$20 per hour. Some bike co-ops will waive the fees for low-income users. Bike Pirates in Toronto, and Bike Again! in Halifax, are examples of co-ops which use a pay what you want strategy. They request that each user make a donation.

Co-ops with lower overhead costs are often more relaxed about cost recovery. For example, one co-op inside an Australian "community environment park" existed rent-free until recently. That co-op continued to charge just US$8 for a one-year membership, including unlimited shop time, even after it began paying rent.

Parts 
The cost of new or used parts is usually added to the shop fee, but is typically substantially below retail prices. Some workshops stock new items such as brake pads, inner tubes, cables and housing, and bearings, for example.

Parts may be sourced from public donations. Children's bikes are often donated when they are outgrown, and abandoned bikes are sometimes obtained through partnerships with police departments (evidence control), street cleaning firms, or from large institutions such as schools and universities.

Bike cooperatives: retail 
When a bicycle cooperatives takes the form of a retail cooperative, it often takes the form of multiple businesses within the industry coming together to achieve economies of scale to compete with big-box brands, department stores and direct-to-consumer bike sales.

Membership 
Retailers' cooperatives are governed by democratic member control, which generally means one vote per member. For many retailer co-ops, however, it is difficult to achieve a democratic standard. Since the members are businesses rather than individuals, offering one vote per member will leave the larger member businesses underrepresented. If the number of votes is based on the size of the business, there is a risk of all smaller businesses within the cooperative being outvoted by a larger business. A democratic solution that many retailers' cooperatives employ is an increase in votes based on business size, up to a certain point, say five or ten votes. This way, there is a varying degree of representation for member businesses, but no one member can gain too much control.

Financing and economic goals 
In order to lower costs, retailers' cooperatives establish central buying locations, providing them with the opportunity to purchase in bulk. Retailers' cooperatives also engage in group advertising and promotion, uniform stock merchandising, and private branding.

The aim of the cooperative is to improve buying conditions for its members, which are retail businesses in this case. The incentive to remain in the cooperative is largely due to the profits that members gain.

Locations 
An early bike co-op was the Fahrrad.Selbsthilfe.Werkstatt, founded in 1983 in a formerly squatted factory in Vienna, Austria. Another early co-op was "P'tit vélo dans la tête", founded in Grenoble, France, in 1994.

In the United States, one of the earliest and longest continuous running co-op is BICAS in Tucson, Arizona, founded in 1994 (named changed to BICAS in 1996.)

Later, some bike co-ops were founded in the western US. Examples include the Salt Lake City Bicycle Collective in Utah, founded 2002, and the Bike Kitchen, founded in 2003 in San Francisco.

Bike co-ops can be found worldwide. The Bike Collective Network includes a regionally sorted list of hundreds of co-ops scattered across a few dozen countries.

Bike co-ops are some of the most historical and long standing co-ops, for example, Edinburgh Bicycle Co-operative is the longest established worker co-operative in Scotland.

A cooperative for American independent bicycle dealers was established in 2003 as "The Biking Solution". Now called The Bike Cooperative, this retailers' cooperative has 300+ members across the country.

See also 

 : discusses self-service, full-service, and roadside assistance
 Bicycle library: a facility for lending bicycles and accessories to riders for trial or use
 Cycling
 Local bike shop
 Makerspace
 Repair café
 Tool library

References

Further reading

External links 

 Bike Collective Network: an umbrella association of bike co-ops and other organizations
 Bike Workshops Research: research into bike workshops led by Simon Batterbury, University of Melbourne

Lists of co-ops worldwide 
 Community Bicycle Organizations: a list of bike co-ops worldwide, sorted by country and province/state
 International Bicycle Fund community bike programs directory. Many of the groups in this directory, though not all of them, are co-ops.
 Bike recyclers in Australia (map and listing, 2022) 
 Ateliers in France (https://www.heureux-cyclage.org/les-ateliers-en-france.html Heureux Cyclage map)

 

Cycle retailers
Cycling infrastructure
Cycling organizations
DIY culture
Recycling organizations